Al Ghaydah District is a district of the Al Mahrah Governorate, Yemen. As of 2003, the district had a population of 27,404 inhabitants.

Al Ghaydah is the biggest city in the district, as well as the capital of Al Mahrah Governorate.

References

Districts of Al Mahrah Governorate